The Tuckerman Water Tower is a historic waterworks facility at the south end of Front Street in Tuckerman, Arkansas.  It is a tall metal structure, with four latticed legs, braced with rods and sloping inward, to support a water tank that is bowl-shaped at the bottom and topped by a conical roof.  A pipe traverses the center of the tower for the movement of water to and from the tank.  Built in 1935 with funding support from the Depression-era Public Works Administration (PWA), it is the only remaining PWA tower of its type in the county.

The tower was listed on the National Register of Historic Places in 2007.

See also
National Register of Historic Places listings in Jackson County, Arkansas

References

Buildings and structures in Jackson County, Arkansas
Infrastructure completed in 1935
Towers completed in 1935
Water towers on the National Register of Historic Places in Arkansas
Public Works Administration in Arkansas
National Register of Historic Places in Jackson County, Arkansas